Palais Caprara-Geymüller, sometimes known as Palais Caprara,  is a Baroque palace in Vienna, Austria. The Vienna Stock Exchange is situated in the palace.

Architecture 
Since the Palais Caprara-Geymüller has a rather atypical design for baroque Vienna, so the Viennese disliked it at first, but they were soon impressed by the massive building that blended into the cityscape without any problems. The facade consists of a five-axis central projection and a two-axis side projection. The horizontal façade is structured by ledges above the floors. In addition, the windows on the first floor are decorated alternately with triangular gables and round arches. The strict structure of the floors is representative of the Italian palace architecture. The entrance gate is bordered by two atlases which support the balcony above. The entrance hall is a transverse, a wide columned hall, from which a three-armed staircase leads to the first floor. The walls of the now subdivided ballroom, which used to extend the entire length of the building, were almost completely covered with architectural paintings that only came to light after a restoration. Only two rooms of the high-quality Empire furnishings have been preserved: The Geymüller Salon and the Pompeian Room, now used as the Wien Museum.

Sources

 W.Kraus, P.Müller: Wiener Palais, 1991
 Bruno Grimschitz: Wiener Barockpaläste, 1944

Caprara
Baroque architecture in Vienna